Chorrera may refer to:

 Chorrera culture, pre-Columbian civilisation of Ecuador and southern Colombia
 Chorrera Formation, Pliocene geologic formation of the Altiplano Cundiboyacense, Colombia
 Chorrera (moth), a genus of snout moths
 Torreón de la Chorrera, fortified tower in Havana, Cuba
 Chorreras, Spain, a site in southeastern Spain formerly host to a Phoenician colony